Everything's Getting Older is an album by Scottish musicians Bill Wells and Aidan Moffat.  Mojo placed the album at number 17 on its list of "Top 50 albums of 2011". On 19 June 2012 the album won the inaugural Scottish Album of the Year Award, beating artists such as Mogwai, Happy Particles and Remember Remember to the £20,000 prize.

Track listing
 Tasogare – 1:58
 Let's Stop Here – 4:19
 Cages – 2:25
 A Short Song to the Moon – 1:03
 Ballad of the Bastard – 2:42
 The Copper Top – 5:22
 Glasgow Jubilee – 3:57
 (If You) Keep Me in Your Heart – 3:24
 Dinner Time – 4:07
 The Sadness in Your Life Will Slowly Fade – 3:17
 The Greatest Story Ever Told – 4:19
 And So Must We Rest – 2:24

References

2011 albums
Aidan Moffat albums
Bill Wells albums
Chemikal Underground albums
Scottish Album of the Year Award winners